Protein RCC2 also known as telophase disk protein of 60 kDa (TD-60) or RCC1-like protein TD-60 is a protein that in humans is encoded by the RCC2 gene.

Function 

RCC2 has structural similarity to RCC1, and has been shown to have weak guanine nucleotide exchange factor (GEF) activity on the small GTPase Rac. TD-60 has also been shown to interact with the Chromosomal Passenger Complex (CPC), and to activate the catalytic component of the CPC, Aurora B, in the presence of microtubules.

References

Further reading

External links